This is a list of universities in Brazil, divided by states.

Across the country there are more than 2,368 Brazilian schools (public and private) recognized by the MEC (Ministry of Education).

Acre
Faculdade da Amazônia Ocidental (FAAO) 
 (FADISI) 
Faculdade Meta
Federal University of Acre (UFAC)
Instituto Federal do Acre (IFAC)
União Educacional do Norte (UNINORTE)

Alagoas
Federal University of Alagoas (UFAL)
 (UNEAL)
 (UNCISAL)

Amapá
Federal University of Amapá (UNIFAP)
 (UEAP)

Amazonas
Amazonas State University (UEA)
Federal University of Amazonas (UFAM)
National Institute of Amazonian Research (INPA)

Bahia
Bahia State University (UNEB)
Catholic University of Salvador (UCSal)
Federal Institute Baiano (IFBAIANO)
Federal Institute of Bahia (IFBA)
Federal University of Bahia (UFBA)
Federal University of Recôncavo da Bahia (UFRB)
Federal University of Southern Bahia (UFOBA)
Federal University of Western Bahia (UFESBA)
State University of Feira de Santana (UEFS)
State University of Santa Cruz (UESC)
State University of Southwestern Bahia (UESB)
Universidade Salvador (UNIFACS)

Ceará
Ceará State University (UECE)
Federal University of Ceará (UFCE)
State University of Vale do Acaraú (Uva)
 (UniFor)
 (URCA)
University for International Integration of the Afro-Brazilian Lusophony (UNILAB)

Distrito Federal
Catholic University of Brasília (UCB)
Centro Universitário de Brasília (UniCEUB)
 (UniDF)
 (UNIEURO)
Federal Institute of Brasília (IFB)
Instituto Científico de Ensino Superior e Pesquisa (UNICESP)
 (IESB)
 (UniP)
University of Brasília (UnB)

Espírito Santo
Federal University of Espírito Santo (UFES)
 (IFES)
Universidade Vila Velha (UVV)

Goiás
Federal University of Goiás (UFG)
Goiás State University (UEG)
Pontifical Catholic University of Goiás (PUC-GO)

 (UniP)
 (UNIVERSO)

Maranhão
Federal University of Maranhão (UFMA)
Logos Institute of Theology
Unidade de Ensino Superior Dom Bosco (UNDB)
 (UNICEUMA)
Universidade Estadual do Maranhão (UEMA)

Mato Grosso
Federal Institute of Mato Grosso (IFMT)
Federal University of Mato Grosso (UFMT)
La Salle College of Lucas do Rio Verde
Mato Grosso State University (Unemat)

Mato Grosso do Sul
Anhanguera-Uniderp University (UNIDERP)
Dom Bosco Catholic University (UCDB)
Federal University of Grande Dourados (UFGD)
Federal University of Mato Grosso do Sul (UFMS)
Mato Grosso do Sul State University (UEMS)

Minas Gerais
 (UNEC)
Federal Center for Technological Education of Minas Gerais (CEFET-MG)
Federal Institute of Minas Gerais (IFMG)
Federal University of Alfenas (UNIFAL)
Federal University of Itajubá (UNIFEI)
Federal University of Juiz de Fora (UFJF)
Federal University of Lavras (UFLA)
Federal University of Minas Gerais (UFMG)
Federal University of Ouro Preto (UFOP)
Federal University of São João del-Rei (UFSJ)
Federal University of Triângulo Mineiro (UFTM)
Federal University of Uberlândia (UFU)
Federal University of Vales do Jequitinhonha e Mucuri (UFVJM)
Federal University of Viçosa (UFV)
FUMEC University (FUMEC)
Guignard University of Art of Minas Gerais
Inatel
 (IFET-JF)
Minas Gerais State University (UEMG)
Pontifical Catholic University of Minas Gerais (PUC-Minas)
State University of Montes Claros (Unimontes)
University Center of Belo Horizonte (UniBH)
University of Itaúna (UIT)

Pará
  (CESUPA)
  (FABEL)
 Federal Institute of Pará (IFPA)
 Federal Rural University of Amazonia (UFRA)
 Federal University of Pará (UFPA)
 Federal University of Southern and Southeastern Pará (UNIFESSPA)
 Federal University of Western Pará (UFOPA)
 Lutheran University of Brazil (ULBRA)
 Pará State University (UEPA)
 Universidade da Amazônia (UNAMA)
  (UNIP-PA)

Paraíba
Federal University of Campina Grande (UFCG)
Federal University of Paraíba (UFPB)
Paraíba State University (UEPB)

Paraná
 (UniFil)
 (UNINTER)
Federal Institute of Paraná (IFPR)
Federal University for Latin American Integration (UNILA)
Federal University of Paraná (UFPR)
Federal University of Technology – Paraná (UTFPR)
Pontifical Catholic University of Paraná (PUC-PR)
State University of Londrina (UEL)
State University of Maringá (UEM)
State University of Ponta Grossa (UEPG)
 (UNICENTRO)
 (UENP)
Universidade Norte do Paraná (UNOPAR)
Universidade Paranaense (UNIPAR)
Universidade Positivo (UP)
 (UTP)
University of the State of Paraná (UNESPAR)
Western Paraná State University (UNIOESTE)

Pernambuco
Catholic University of Pernambuco (UniCaP)
Federal Institute of Pernambuco (IFPE)
Federal Rural University of Pernambuco (UFRPE)
Federal University of Pernambuco (UFPE)
Federal University of the São Francisco Valley (UNIVASF)
University of Pernambuco (UPE)

Piauí
Centro Universitário Uninovafapi (UNINOVAFAPI)
Federal University of Piauí (UFPI)
 (UESPI)

Rio de Janeiro

Catholic University of Petrópolis (UCP)
Centro Universitário IBMR (IBMR)
Estácio de Sá Universities (UNESA)
Federal Center for Technological Education of Rio de Janeiro (CEFET/RJ)
Federal Institute of Rio de Janeiro (IFRJ)
Federal Rural University of Rio de Janeiro (UFRRJ)
Federal University of Rio de Janeiro (UFRJ)
Federal University of the State of Rio de Janeiro (UNIRIO)
Fluminense Federal University (UFF)
Fundação Getulio Vargas (FGV-Rio)
Instituto Militar de Engenharia (IME)
Petrópolis Medical School (FMP/FASE)
Pontifical Catholic University of Rio de Janeiro (PUC-Rio)
Rio de Janeiro State University (UERJ)
State University of Northern Rio de Janeiro (UENF)
Universidade Candido Mendes (UCAM)
 (UCB)
 (UNIGRANRIO)
 (UNIG)
 (UNIVERSO)
Universidade Santa Úrsula (USU)
Universidade Veiga de Almeida (UVA)
University of Vassouras (USS)
West Zone State University (UEZO)

Rio Grande do Norte
Federal Rural University of the Semi-arid Region (UFERSA)
Federal University of Rio Grande do Norte (UFRN)
 (UERN)
 (UnP)

Rio Grande do Sul
Catholic University of Pelotas (UCPel)
Centro Universitário Ritter dos Reis (UniRitter)
Federal Institute of Rio Grande do Sul (IFRS)
Federal University of Health Sciences of Porto Alegre (UFCSPA)
Federal University of Pampa (Unipampa)
Federal University of Pelotas (UFPel)
Federal University of Rio Grande (FURG)
Federal University of Rio Grande do Sul (UFRGS)
Federal University of Santa Maria (UFSM)
 (IC-FUC)
Lutheran University of Brazil (ULBRA)
Pontifical Catholic University of Rio Grande do Sul (PUC-RS)
Rio Grande do Sul State University  (UERGS)
Sul-Rio-Grandense Federal Institute (IFSul)
 (URCAMP)
Universidade de Santa Cruz do Sul (UNISC)
Universidade do Vale do Rio dos Sinos (Unisinos)
Universidade Feevale (FEEVALE)
Universidade Franciscana (Unifra)
 (Unilasalle)
 (UNIJUÍ)
 (URI)
University of Caxias do Sul (UCS)
University of Cruz Alta (UNICRUZ)
University of Passo Fundo (UPF)
University of Taquari Valley (UNIVATES)

Rondônia
  (FAMA)
 Federal University of Rondônia (UNIR)
 Instituição de Ensino Superior de Cacoal (FANORTE)

Roraima
 Federal University of Roraima (UFRR)

Santa Catarina
Federal Institute of Santa Catarina (IFSC)
Federal University of Fronteira Sul (UFFS)
Federal University of Santa Catarina (UFSC)
Santa Catarina State University (Udesc)
 (Univille)
Universidade do Extremo Sul Catarinense (UNESC)
 (UNOESC)
 (Uniplac)
 (Unisul)
 (Univali)
 (FURB)

São Paulo
Public
Federal Institute of São Paulo (IFSP)
Federal University of ABC (UFABC)
Federal University of São Carlos (UFSCar)
Federal University of São Paulo (Unifesp)
Fundação Educacional do Município de Assis (FEMA)
Instituto Tecnológico de Aeronáutica (ITA)
Municipal University of São Caetano do Sul (USCS)
São Paulo State Technological Colleges (FATEC)
São Paulo State University (Unesp)
State University of Campinas (Unicamp)
Universidade de Taubaté (Unitau)
Universidade Livre de Música (ULM)
University of São Paulo (USP)
Virtual University of the State of São Paulo (UNIVESP)

Private
Anhembi Morumbi University (UAM)
Bandeirante University of São Paulo (UNIBAN)
Catholic University of Santos (UNISANTOS)
 (FEBASP)
Centro Universitário da FEI (FEI)
Centro Universitário das Faculdades Metropolitanas Unidas (FMU)
Centro Universitário Eurípedes de Marília (UNIVEM)
Centro Universitário Ítalo Brasileiro (UniÍtalo)
 (CUSC)
Escola Superior de Propaganda e Marketing (ESPM)
Fundação Armando Alvares Penteado (FAAP)
 (FECAP)
Fundação Getulio Vargas (FGV)
 (FSA)
Insper Institute of Education and Research (Insper)
Instituto Mauá de Tecnologia (IMT)
Mackenzie Presbyterian University (Mackenzie)
Methodist University of Piracicaba (Unimep)
Methodist University of São Paulo (Umesp)
Pontifical Catholic University of Campinas (PUC-Campinas)
Pontifical Catholic University of São Paulo (PUC-SP)
 (UNICID)
Universidade de Mogi das Cruzes (UMC)
Universidade de Ribeirão Preto (UNAERP)
 (UNISA)
Universidade do Vale do Paraíba (UNIVAP)
 (UNG)
 (UNINOVE)
 (UniP)
 (UNISANTA)
Universidade São Francisco (USF)
Universidade São Judas Tadeu (USJT)
 (UNIMARCO, closed in 2012)

Sergipe
Federal University of Sergipe (UFS)

Tocantins
Federal University of Tocantins (UFT)
 (UNITINS)
 (UFNT)

See also
List of federal universities of Brazil
List of public universities in Brazil
List of state universities in Brazil
Rankings of universities in Brazil
Universities and higher education in Brazil

References

External links
Universities in Brazil by region

Universities By State
Brazil
Brazil